76 Squadron, 76th Squadron or No. 76 Squadron may refer to:

 No. 76 Squadron RAAF, a unit of the Royal Australian Air Force 
 No. 76 Squadron RAF, a unit of the United Kingdom Royal Air Force 
 76th Fighter Squadron, a unit of the United States Air Force 
 76th Air Refueling Squadron, a unit of the United States Air Force 
 76th Space Control Squadron, a unit of the United States Air Force 
 76th Airlift Squadron, a unit of the United States Air Force

See also
 76th Division (disambiguation)
 76th Regiment